The Bukit Raja Selatan LRT station is a provisional light rapid transit (LRT) station that serves the suburb of Klang in Selangor, Malaysia. It serves as one of the stations on the Shah Alam line. The station is an elevated rapid transit station in Taman Perindustrian Bukit Raja Selatan, Klang, Selangor, Malaysia, forming part of the Klang Valley Integrated Transit System.

The station is marked as Station No. 16 along the RM9 billion line project with the line's maintenance depot located in Johan Setia, Klang. The Bukit Raja Selatan LRT station is expected to be operational in February 2024 and will have facilities such as public parking, kiosks, restrooms, elevators, taxi stand and feeder bus among others.

Locality landmarks
 Bukit Raja Selatan Industrial Park
 Pusat Perniagaan Seksyen 7
 De Art Hotel Shah Alam

References

External links
 LRT3 Bandar Utama–Klang line

Rapid transit stations in Selangor
Shah Alam Line